James “Jimmy” Rees (born 15 July 1987) is an Australian children's entertainer best known for playing the role of Jimmy Giggle on ABC Kids' flagship program Giggle and Hoot from 2009 to 2020.

Personal life
Rees was born in Frankston, Victoria and grew up in Mount Eliza, Victoria and moved to the Central Coast of New South Wales, at age 22 to star as "Jimmy Giggle" in the ABC children's programme Giggle and Hoot (filmed in the ABC's Ultimo studios).

Rees married his long term partner Tori in 2013 and they have three sons named Lenny, Mack and Vinny.  After Rees finished up with Giggle and Hoot, they moved from the Central Coast, New South Wales to the Mornington Peninsula in Victoria.

Career
Rees was the host of the Australian ABC children's programme Giggle and Hoot from 2009 to 2020. In the programme, Jimmy Giggle (James Rees) is shown to enjoy mending objects, although he relies on a "problematic magic button" that never works. He is portrayed as having a brilliant talent in creating new things out of regular items. He also plays several musical instruments in the programme, including the ukulele, double bass, baritone saxophone, piano and guitar. It was reported that Rees beat 5,000 other actors to win the role, and moved to the Central Coast from his home town in Victoria for the role.

Rees competed in the sixteenth season of the Australian version of Network 10's Dancing with the Stars in 2019, where he was partnered with Alexandra Vladimirov. Rees made it to the top 5 of the contest but withdrew from the competition when one of his infant twin sons Mack suffered complications during a routine medical procedure. During the Dancing with the Stars competition Rees scored best dancer in his renditions of the Foxtrot and Salsa performed to "Hold My Girl" – George Ezra and "I Know You Want Me (Calle Ocho)" – Pitbull respectively, and won the second week of the competition with his rendition of the Jive performed to "Don't Stop Me Now" – Queen. Rees was also a member of the winning team "La La Land" of the group dance with fellow competitors Courtney Act, Jett Kenny and Michelle Bridges.

Rees has also starred in a number of pantomime stage productions.  He has performed in Bonnie Lythgoe productions including Snow White Winter Family Musical in 2014 and Cinderella in 2016. In July 2019 Rees is scheduled to appear in a production of Jack and the beanstalk as "Silly Billy", alongside fellow Australian actors Peter Rowsthorn and Luke Joslin.

Rees has also made appearances on a number of Australian TV programmes including JuicedTV in 2015 and Whovians in 2017

In 2018, Rees was crowned King of Moomba.

In November 2019, Rees announced that he had decided to end his stint with Giggle and Hoot. He was quoted as saying that he had decided to move on to a different phase of his life. The show's "gruelling schedule", involving shooting for 47 weeks a year, had made it difficult for his growing family of three young children.

In 2020 he started releasing short humorous videos on TikTok and YouTube, covering topics such as parenting, packaging and the Covid-19 pandemic. His most well known videos are those in a series called "Meanwhile in Australia", where he plays the role of each state and territory negotiating lockdowns, borders and vaccinations. As of August 2021, the series had gained over 8 million followers on social media and 10 million fans on TikTok.

In 2023, he is competing as a contestant on the first season of Taskmaster Australia with Tom Gleeson.

References

External links
 
 

1987 births
21st-century Australian male actors
Australian male television actors
Australian children's musicians
Australian TikTokers
Living people
People from Mount Eliza, Victoria
Male actors from Melbourne
Television personalities from Melbourne